Umar Farouk Osman (born September 23, 1998) is a Ghanaian footballer who plays college soccer for the Michigan Wolverines men's soccer program.

Osman is the 2017 recipient of Gatorade Player of the Year award for boys' soccer. The award is a nationally recognized honor given to the best high school athlete in the nation. Osman won the award while playing for the Hotchkiss School in Lakeville, Connecticut. Outside of playing for the Hotchkiss Bearcats boys' soccer team, Osman also played club soccer for Black Rock FC.

Senior 
During the 2019 USL League Two season, Osman played one match for the Flint City Bucks.

References

External links 
 U-Michigan Player Profile

1998 births
Living people
Association football midfielders
Ghanaian footballers
Ghanaian expatriate footballers
Michigan Wolverines men's soccer players
People from Litchfield County, Connecticut
People from Tamale, Ghana
Soccer players from Connecticut
Sportspeople from the New York metropolitan area
USL League Two players
Flint City Bucks players